Yang Yong (born 19 October 1963) is a male Chinese water polo player who was part of the gold medal winning team at the 1986 Asian Games. He also competed at the 1988 Summer Olympics, and was part of the silver medal winning team at the 1994 Asian Games.

References
 
 

1963 births
Living people
Chinese male water polo players
Olympic water polo players of China
Sportspeople from Guangdong
People from Zhanjiang
Water polo players at the 1988 Summer Olympics
Asian Games medalists in water polo
Water polo players at the 1986 Asian Games
Water polo players at the 1994 Asian Games
Medalists at the 1986 Asian Games
Medalists at the 1994 Asian Games
Asian Games gold medalists for China
Asian Games silver medalists for China
20th-century Chinese people